Country Sunshine With Myrna Lorrie is a Canadian country music television miniseries which aired on CBC Television in 1974.

Premise
Myrna Lorrie, who was a regular on Countrytime, hosted her own series which was produced at CBC Halifax. Eric Robertson was a regular performer.

Scheduling
This half-hour series was broadcast on Thursdays at 9:30 p.m. (Eastern) from 25 July to 8 August 1974.

References

External links
 

CBC Television original programming
1974 Canadian television series debuts
1974 Canadian television series endings
Television shows filmed in Halifax, Nova Scotia
1970s Canadian music television series